Thayiya Madilalli is a 1981 Indian Kannada-language film, directed by B. Subba Rao and produced by A. L. Abbaiah Naidu. The film stars Ashok, Aarathi, Udaykumar and Balakrishna. The film has musical score by Chellapilla Satyam.
Aarathi and Ashok who played brother-sister for the second time in this movie (the first was Pavana Ganga) were a popular romantic pair of the time.

Cast

 Aarathi
 Ashok
 Varnashri
 Shankar Nag in Guest Appearance
 Udaykumar
 Balakrishna
 Leelavathi
 Tiger Prabhakar
 Shailashree 
 Halam

Soundtrack
The music was composed by Satyam.

References

External links
 
 

1980s Kannada-language films
Films scored by Satyam (composer)
Films directed by B. A. Subba Rao